Miss Germany 2012 was a competition held on 11 February 2012 to award the title of Miss Germany for the year. Twenty-year-old Isabel Gülck won the title.

Results

Placings

Delegates 
The Miss Germany 2012 "delegates" were:

Judges 
Reiner Calmund
Marcus Schenkenberg

References

External links
 Miss Germany Corporation official website

2012 in Germany
2012 beauty pageants
Beauty pageants in Germany